The gorge of  is a nationally designated Place of Scenic Beauty on the island of Shōdo-shima, Kagawa Prefecture, Japan. Part of the Setonaikai National Park, the heights rise to 812 m. The area is celebrated for its Japanese maple trees. Volunteers formed a preservation society in 1898 and when, in 1912, expropriation of the area was attempted, a soy sauce magnate stepped in to ensure its preservation. In 1927 Kankakei was selected as one of the 100 Landscapes of Japan.

Landmarks

The Front Side 12
 Tsutenso
 Kountei
 Kinbyobu
 Rosando
 Senjogan
 Gyokujunpo
 Gachoseki
 Soundan
 Kayogaku
 Eboshiiwa
 Joraheki
 Shibocho

The Back Side 8
 Shikaiwa
 Matsutakeiwa
 Taishido
 Noboritake
 Taikigan
 Futamiiwa
 Horagaiwa
 Sekimon

See also

 Kankakei Ropeway
 Olive Jinja
 Setonaikai National Park

References

Geography of Kagawa Prefecture
Tourist attractions in Kagawa Prefecture
Places of Scenic Beauty